Castilla, officially the Municipality of Castilla, is a 3rd class municipality in the province of Sorsogon, Philippines. According to the 2020 census, it has a population of 60,635 people.

Geography

Barangays
Castilla is divided into 34 barangays.

Climate

Demographics

Economy

Majority of the males (62.02%) falling under working age population were employed while only a little over 10% of the females were employed. Out of the municipality's labor force, majority (52.54%) were not economically active who were either too old, sick, or still at school age. Overall, the total employment rate in Castilla was only 40.95% while unemployment was recorded at 6.50%. This is expected considering that there is inadequate employment opportunity in the municipality.

Total dependency ratio in Castilla was computed at 86.57%, which indicates more mouths to feed for those with gainful employment. Young dependency ratio was computed at 79.97% while old dependency ratio was 6.60%.

Farming and fishing are the main employment opportunities but are characteristically seasoned in nature. Castilla has 13 coastal barangays, which depend on fishing as the main economic activity.

References

External links
 Castilla Profile at PhilAtlas.com
 [ Philippine Standard Geographic Code]
 Philippine Census Information
 Local Governance Performance Management System

Municipalities of Sorsogon